The Seventh Federal Electoral District of Coahuila (VII Distrito Electoral Federal de Coahuila) is one of the 300 Electoral Districts into which Mexico is divided for the purpose of elections to the federal Chamber of Deputies and one of seven such districts in the state of Coahuila.

It elects one deputy to the lower house of Congress for each three-year legislative period, by means of the first past the post system.

District territory
Under the 2005 districting scheme, Coahuila's Sixth District covers the western half of the municipality of Saltillo.

The district's head town (cabecera distrital), where results from individual polling stations are gathered together and collated, is the city of Saltillo.

Deputies returned to Congress from this district

LI Legislature
 1979–1982:
LII Legislature
 1982–1985:
LIII Legislature
 1985–1988:
LIV Legislature
 1988–1991:
LV Legislature
 1991–1994:
LVI Legislature
 1994–1997: José Luis Flores Méndez (PRI)
LVII Legislature
 1997–1999: Enrique Martínez y Martínez (PRI)
 1999–2000: Pilar Cabrera Hernández (PRI)
LVIII Legislature
 2000–2003: Miguel Airxpe Jiménez (PRI)
LIX Legislature
 2003–2006: Aldo Martínez Hernández (PRI)
LX Legislature
 2006–2009: Oscar Miguel Mohamar Dainitín (PAN)

References

Federal electoral districts of Mexico
Federal Electoral District 07
Federal Electoral District 07